Welcome to Night Vale is a fiction podcast presented as a radio show for the fictional town of Night Vale, reporting on the strange events that occur within it. The series was created in 2012 by Joseph Fink and Jeffrey Cranor. Published by Night Vale Presents since March 15, 2015, the podcast was previously published by Commonplace Books. Cecil Gershwin Palmer—the host, main character, and narrator—is voiced by Cecil Baldwin, while secondary characters are sometimes voiced by guest stars or recurring guests—such as Dylan Marron, who voices Carlos the Scientist. The podcast typically airs on the first and fifteenth of every month, and consists of "news, announcements and advertisements" from the desert town, located "somewhere in the Southwestern United States."  In an interview with NPR, Joseph Fink said  that he "came up with this idea of a town in that desert where all conspiracy theories were real, and we would just go from there with that understood."

Production

Every episode of the podcast includes a piece of music as "the weather", each by a different independently published artist. The theme and background instrumental music to the series were created by the musician and composer Disparition.

In October 2013, Welcome to Night Vale began presenting live shows, which continued into 2014 with a tour of the West Coast. In addition, it was announced during the episode "The Auction" that a novel would be published in 2015. Fink stated that "it's going to have all the characters and weird atmosphere that you want from Night Vale, with a brand new story that explores parts of Night Vale that we just haven't been able to get into with the podcast". When the book became available for preorder the following March, it became Amazon's number-two title seven months ahead of its October release date.

Welcome to Night Vales plot consists of long-form storytelling. Individual episodes usually function as standalone narratives and only rarely contain significant developments in story line. The writers employ running jokes and plot arcs; for example, The Glow Cloud, one of the series's most iconic characters, hypnotizes the townspeople with its colors and noxious gas, making people chant "ALL HAIL THE GLOW CLOUD," and eventually becomes president of Night Vale's school board. Another running joke is the low survival rate of interns at the radio station; the only interns, former and present, who are currently alive include (in order of appearance) Cecil, Chad Bowinger, Dana Cardinal, Maureen, and Kareem.

Characters and narratives often emerge and develop slowly, while unrelated stories may combine to form new plot points. Major stories have included the development of a romantic relationship between Cecil and Carlos; the stranding of several characters, including Carlos, in a "desert otherworld"; the invasion of Night Vale by the corporation StrexCorp, from the rival town of Desert Bluffs, and StrexCorp's eventual expulsion from Night Vale; the 2014 mayoral elections, with subsequent terrorist activities by failed mayoral candidates The Faceless Old Woman Who Secretly Lives in Your Home and Hiram McDaniels; and the complications surrounding McDaniels's subsequent imprisonment and trial. The series's fourth anniversary in June 2016 coincided with a two-part climax to the most recent storyline: the invasion of Night Vale by mysterious strangers, led by a demonic beagle puppy accidentally summoned from Hell by Chad Bowinger, a former radio intern. The early plot point of a miniature city buried under the town's bowling alley resurfaced after this, in addition to the sporadic appearance of Huntokar, a deer-headed deity with connections to both the tiny city and Night Vale's unusual nature. More recent plot points include the resolution of the Blood Space War, the aging of Lee Marvin, the town being brought back into the normal flow of time, and the whereabouts of the missing Delta flight 18713.

Premise 
Welcome to Night Vale takes place in the fictional town of Night Vale, a desert town somewhere in the southwestern United States. In this town, the myriad paranormal and supernatural occurrences are treated as mundane. For example, Cecil remarks on how cute the cat hovering above the sink in the station bathroom is, but does not find it strange that the cat is doing so. Fink describes the town as "a Southwestern commuter suburb with no place for anyone to commute to."

Cast and characters
Cecil Baldwin as Cecil Gershwin Palmer, the narrator of the podcast and the host of Night Vale's radio station. He is described as "not too short or tall, not fat or too thin." His true age is unknown, as he references being alive for events hundreds of years in the past; however, time does not work correctly in Night Vale. Cecil adopts a cat named Khoshekh who is found floating in a stationary position in the station's men's bathroom. He is also Jewish. In the credits he is referred to as "The Voice of Night Vale."
Dylan Marron as Carlos, Cecil's scientist boyfriend and later husband. Described as having "perfect hair" and "teeth like a military cemetery," he initially comes to Night Vale as an outsider but soon integrates into the community through his relationship with Cecil. Cecil fawns over him for the first year of the podcast before they begin dating. They were married in the series's hundredth episode "Toast," and in the "A Spy in the Desert" live show, it was revealed that the couple had adopted a son named Esteban whom they had kept secret for two years.
Jasika Nicole as Dana Cardinal, former Night Vale Community Radio Intern and former mayor of Night Vale. In the episode "The Sandstorm," she kills her double, an act that comes back to haunt her after Danas from parallel realities seek revenge on her in Year Six. To date, she is one of few people who have survived Night Vale Community Radio's internship program.
Kevin R. Free as Kevin, Cecil's Desert Bluffs counterpart obsessed with blood and gore, offsetting his cheery disposition. He now lives in the Desert Otherworld, which he has named Desert Bluffs Too!, from which he continues to broadcast his radio program.
Lauren Sharpe as Lauren Mallard, the former head of StrexCorp and current mayor of Desert Bluffs Too!, although in reality she is second-in-command to Kevin.
Mara Wilson as The Faceless Old Woman Who Secretly Lives in Your Home, a former mayoral candidate and corporeal being who simultaneously lives in the homes of all Night Vale residents. She is the protagonist of the third Night Vale novel, The Faceless Old Woman Who Secretly Lives in Your Home.
Jackson Publick as Hiram McDaniels, a literal five-headed dragon and former mayoral candidate. After attempting to assassinate the Mayor, four of his heads are placed on trial, excluding the Violet head, who worked to prevent the assassination.
Retta as Josefina Ortiz, commonly known as Old Woman Josie, Cecil's dearest friend and formerly the only person in town to openly acknowledge the existence of Angels. She died in 2017.
Hal Lublin as Steve Carlsberg, Cecil's brother-in-law whom he used to dislike, but now respects. Steve is one of the few people in Night Vale who sees past the City Council's lies and conspiracies, much to the annoyance of Cecil. His daughter Janice has spina bifida and is captain of her school's wheelchair basketball team.
Symphony Sanders as Tamika Flynn, a well-read young woman formerly in charge of a teenage militia in the desert and currently the only member of the City Council that is not part of their one singular body.
Maureen Johnson as Intern Maureen, Michelle's girlfriend and a disgruntled former Night Vale Community Radio intern and former commander of an army of Strangers. 
Kate Jones as Michelle Nguyen, Maureen's girlfriend and the owner of Dark Owl Records who disdains any music that is remotely popular.
Mark Gagliardi as John Peters, a local farmer who specializes in growing imaginary corn. His brother was one of the many people taken by the Blood Space War.
Desiree Burch as Pamela Winchell, the former mayor of Night Vale and current Head of Emergency Press Conferences.
Emma Frankland as Sheriff Sam, who became sheriff of Night Vale after the previous sheriff mysteriously disappeared. They use they/them pronouns.
Tina Parker as Huntokar the Destroyer, the deer-masked and deer-faced goddess who created Night Vale.
Wil Wheaton as Earl Harlan, a local celebrity chef at the restaurant "Tourniquet." He is a childhood friend of Cecil, although he has difficulty remembering his past.
Meg Bashwiner as Deb, a sentient patch of haze, who comes on the show to read advertisements. She has a sister named Caitlyn who is also voiced by Bashwiner. 
Bashwiner also provides the voice of "Proverb Lady", who reads the credits at the end of every episode alongside a humorous proverb.
James Urbaniak as Leonard Burton, the former host of Night Vale Community Radio and Cecil's childhood idol.
Marc Evan Jackson as Marcus Vanston, an extraordinarily wealthy Night Vale citizen who was turned into an Angel during the mayoral debate.
Molly Quinn as Melony Pennington, a computer programming prodigy.
Quinn also voices Fey, a computer program from the radio station WZZZ that reads random numbers of an unknown purpose, but eventually becomes sentient. 
Felicia Day as Joanna Rey, a shape-shifting zookeeper.
Jason Webley as Louie Blasko, the former owner of Louie's Music Shop before it burned down and he skipped town with the insurance money. His ghost sometimes returns to Night Vale to teach lessons.
Annie Savage as Diane Crayton, the treasurer of the Night Vale PTA and the co-protagonist of the Welcome to Night Vale novel.
Joseph Fink as Teddy Williams, the owner of the Desert Flower Bowling Alley and Arcade Fun Complex, which used to house a parallel dimension of tiny people under Lane 5.  
Fink also voices Josh Crayton, Diane's shape-shifter son who takes the form of a "Thirty-something podcast writer" during the "All Hail" live show.
He voiced "Intern Joseph" in "The Investigators" live show, Telly the Barber in the "A Spy in the Desert" live show, sang a song as youth basketball coach Jacobin McPhee in the episode "The Veterans", and voiced a fictionalized version of himself in the episodes "Listeners" and "Salmon Burger".
Aliee Chan as Basimah Bashara, a young Muslim woman whose father has been away fighting the Blood Space War for most of her life.
Dessa as Sabina, Cecil's pregnant cousin.
Hunter Canning as Hugh Jackman, the owner of the new technology start up company  who shares his name with the famous actor.
Lusia Strus as Missy Wilkes, a Night Vale citizen and former Playboy Playmate.
Erica Livingston and Christopher Loar as Maggie and Donald Penebaker, a husband and wife who serve as the voices of the phone tree menus for all services in Night Vale.
Flor De Liz Perez as Lacy Hernez, a representative for the Night Vale Department of Water
Jeffrey Cranor as Charles, Carlos's Desert Bluffs counterpart. He is a theologist and Kevin's boyfriend. 
Cranor also voiced Carlos in his first appearance, the Secret Police Spokesperson in "The Investigators" live show, Lee Marvin in the "A Spy in the Desert" live show, and a fictionalized version of himself in the episode "Listeners".
TL Thompson as Lee Marvin, Night Vale's most local celebrity who has been perpetually having his 30th birthday since time immemorial. He is responsible for time in Night Vale being put back to normal in the Year Seven finale.
Rob Neill as Kasper Rhodes, a businessman in town who offers to freeze people's brains after they die with the intent of achieving immortality.
Robin Virgine as Radio Jupiter, a mysterious broadcast from a distant star.
Julia Morizawa as Lucy in Claremont, a caller in to the show.
Janet Varney as Megan Wallaby, a young woman who was born as an adult man's disembodied hand, who was later given to a middle aged body donor missing his left hand. In 2021 her body is killed, leaving her a disembodied hand once more. She now lives in a tarantula den with her spider husband.
Varney also voices Janet Lubell
Jonathan Atkinson as Silas, a former art thief who was turned into a cat by his partner through magic. In his current life he is Cecil’s pet cat Khoshekh, who he found floating in the men’s bathroom at the station.
Adal Rifai, John Patrick Coan, and Erin Keif as Kareem, Doug, and Gina. They are the hosts of The Kareem Nazari Show, a fictional broadcast in-universe airing from WMCG 1080 AM in Ann Arbor, Michigan. In real life Rifai, Coan, and Keif are the co-hosts of the podcast Hey Riddle Riddle.
In the live show "The Librarian" Andrew WK, James Urbaniak, Molly Quinn, and Wil Wheaton all perform the same monologue as a new intern at the station, but on different days of the tour.

Guest writers
While every episode of the show is written by creators Joseph Fink and Jeffery Cranor, so far 28 episodes and 2 bonus episodes have had guest co-writers.

Episode 9 "PYRAMID" - Regic Lacher (pyramid messages)
Episode 18 "The Traveler" - Zach Parsons (lead story)
Episode 20 "Poetry Week" - Trilety Wade, Russel Swenson, Vanessa Irena, Katherine Ciel, Erika Paschold, and Danielle DuBois (poem submissions)
Episode 28 "Summer Reading Program" - Ashley Lierman
Episode 29 "Subway" - Russel Swenson
Episode 34 "A Beautiful Dream" - Zach Parsons
Episode 37 "The Auction" - Glen David Gold
Episode 39 "The Woman from Italy" - Glen David Gold (additional material)
Episode 40 "The Deft Bowman" - Zach Parsons (additional material)
Episode 50 "Capital Campaign" - Ashley Lierman
Episode 79 "Lost in the Mail" - Zack Parsons
Episode 91 "The 12:37" - James Moran
Episode 101 "Guidelines for Disposal" - Brie Williams
Episode 112 "Citizen Spotlight" - Brie Williams
Episode 113 "Niecelet" - Dessa
Episodes 117-119 " (Parts 1-3)" - Glen David Gold
Episodes 124-126 "A Door Ajar (Parts 1-3)" - Brie Williams
Episode 133 "Are You Sure?" - Brie Williams
Episode 138 "Harvest Time" - Brie Williams
Episode 141 "Save Dark Owl Records" - Brie Williams
Episode 143 "Pioneer Days" - Brie Williams
Episode 151 "The Waterfall" - Brie Williams
Episode 168 "Secret Blotter" - Brie Williams
Episode 178 "Rattlesnake Rest" - Brie Williams
Bonus Episode 1: "Minutes" - Ashley Lierman
Bonus Episode 2: "What of the Sea?" - Marta Rainerz

Books

Welcome to Night Vale

In October 2015 Fink and Cranor released a novel by the same name, Welcome to Night Vale. It is told primarily from the viewpoints of Jackie Fierro and Diane Crayton, both citizens of Night Vale who have been featured in the podcast. Critical reception for the book has been positive. The audiobook is narrated by Cecil Baldwin.

It Devours!
In the March 15, 2017 episode of the podcast, Fink announced a second novel, titled It Devours!, which deals with Carlos and his team of scientists investigating the Cult of the Smiling God. It was released October 17, 2017. The audiobook is narrated by Cecil Baldwin.

The Faceless Old Woman Who Secretly Lives In Your Home
In the September 15, 2019 episode of the podcast it was announced that the third Night Vale novel, The Faceless Old Woman Who Secretly Lives In Your Home, would be released on March 24, 2020. The novel was once again co-written by Fink and Cranor and focuses on the backstory of the title character. The audiobook is narrated by Mara Wilson, who provides the voice of the Faceless Old Woman on the podcast.

Script books
To date Welcome to Night Vale has released four books featuring scripts from the show as well as commentary, introductions by the authors and original illustrations. Each book corresponds to a season (or year) of the podcast. They include Mostly Void, Partially Stars for Year One, The Great Glowing Coils of the Universe for Year Two, The Buying of Lot 37 for Year Three, and Who's a Good Boy? for Year Four.

Reception
The show has been described as "the news from Lake Wobegon as seen through the eyes of Stephen King", and Christopher Wynn of The Dallas Morning News characterized it as "NPR meets The Mothman Prophecies". The Daily Dots Gavia Baker-Whitelaw compared the podcast to being "caught somewhere between Weird Twitter and 'Tales of the Unexplained'" and said that it is "well worth a listen—although possibly not after dark, if you live in a small town yourself". Colin Griffith of The A.V. Club said the show is "really well done, offering a surrealist/absurdist (and occasionally existentialist) take on community radio, with dispatches from the small, delectably nightmarish desert town of Night Vale." Writing for TechGeek, Erin Hill considered the uniqueness of the podcast to be "its presentation of what is ordinary", adding that "many of the things that Cecil reports goes against our idea of normal, but [everything] is presented in a manner that makes it seem mundane."

In July 2013, Welcome to Night Vale was ranked second on the top ten audio podcasts list on iTunes, behind radio program This American Life. During the same month, it surpassed This American Life to become first on the podcasts list, having received 150,000 downloads during a single week.

In December 2013, The A.V. Club ranked the show seventh on its Best Podcasts of 2013 list.

Co-producer Jeffrey Cranor attributed this spike in popularity to both Tumblr and fans of the television series Hannibal. Max Sebela, a creative strategist for Tumblr, stated that the fan following began to "spiral out of control" beginning on July 5, with that week having "20,000-plus posts about 'Night Vale,' with 183,000-plus individual blogs participating in the conversation, and 680,000-plus notes". The Twitter account for the podcast has been noted as having more than 20,000 followers by July 2013.

According to The Daily Dot, new listeners primarily come through fan following and word of mouth primarily on Tumblr with fan fiction and fan art focusing on the romantic relationship between the show's narrator and scientist Carlos. Fans have published "fanscripts," transcripts of the podcast, in order to widen the accessibility of Welcome to Night Vale.

On October 15, 2015, producers Joseph Fink and Jeffrey Cranor were interviewed on The Late Show with Stephen Colbert, and Cecil Baldwin appeared for a Community Calendar public service message for Night Vale. Mike Rugnetta of PBS's web show Idea Channel compares the show to horror writer H. P. Lovecraft's style of writing about fear of what we don't know. He says, "But Night Vale turns Lovecraft's 'unimaginable terror' into 'drab mundanity.'"

Awards

Television adaptation 
In December 2017, it was announced that Gennifer Hutchison, a writer and producer on Better Call Saul and Breaking Bad, is adapting Welcome to Night Vale for television. The series is being produced by Sony Pictures Television, where Hutchison has an overall deal, and developed for FX. Fink and Cranor will serve as executive producers.

See also 
Limetown
Scarfolk
SCP Foundation

References

Further reading

External links

 

2012 podcast debuts
Audio podcasts
Comedy and humor podcasts
Horror podcasts
Science fiction podcasts
Weird fiction
LGBT-related podcasts
Existentialist works
Southwestern United States in fiction
Magic realism
Patreon creators
Podcasts adapted for other media
American podcasts
Night Vale Presents
Scripted podcasts